Secondary Highway 541A, commonly referred to as Highway 541A, was a provincially maintained secondary highway in the Canadian province of Ontario. This short  spur connected Highway 541 (now Greater Sudbury Road 86) north of  Garson with the community of Falconbridge.

Highway 541A is now known as Municipal Road 89, and follows Longyear Drive. It was formally part of the Falconbridge Highway, and existed originally as a spur of Highway 541 when secondary highways were first introduced in 1956. The route gained its own designation by 1962, and continued to exist until the formation of the Regional Municipality of Sudbury, now Greater Sudbury, in 1973.

Route description 
Highway 541A was a short spur of Highway 541, connecting it to the large mines at Falconbridge. Most of the route is surrounded by undeveloped lands, except the final  that lie in the residential portion of Falconbridge.

History 
The route of Highway 541 was first assumed by the Department of Highways in early 1956, along with several dozen other secondary highways. The route formed a spur of Highway 541 originally, without its own designation;
it did not gain its own route number until 1962.
The highway followed the northernmost portion of the Falconbridge Highway, a road constructed in 1937 to connect Sudbury with the mining deposits located in the area several decades earlier.
The route remained unchanged until the formation of the Regional Municipality of Sudbury, now Greater Sudbury, in 1973. By 1974, the highway was transferred to the region.
Today it is known as Sudbury Regional Road 89.

Major intersections

References 

541
541A
Roads in Greater Sudbury